In plasma astrophysics, the corotation electric field is the electric field due to the rotation of a magnet. For example, the rotation of the Earth results in a corotation electric field.

Introduction

Earth's magnetosphere

See also

Magnetospheric electric convection field

References

Geomagnetism